Clear channel may refer to:

 iHeartMedia, a US broadcasting company formerly known as Clear Channel Communications
 Clear Channel Outdoor, an advertising company formerly a subsidiary of iHeartMedia
 Clear-channel station, a regulatory category of AM broadcast stations in North America